Utenzi or utend̠i is a form of narrative poetry in Swahili. Its name derives from the fact that it usually describes heroic deeds, like the medieval European gesta (lit. "deeds"). Utendi, plural tendi, meaning "act" or "deed", is derived from the Swahili verb ku-tenda "to do". Well-known examples of utenzi are the Utendi wa Tambuka by Bwana Mwengo (one of the earliest known literary works in Swahili, dated 1728), the Utenzi wa Shufaka, and the Utenzi wa vita vya Uhud (the epic of the battle of Uhud) compiled around 1950 by Haji Chum. Reciting utenzi is a popular pastime on weddings and other ceremonies and feasts; often, specialized narrators are invited to do this.

Utenzi verse form consists of four-line stanzas, with each line having eight syllables. The last syllables of the first three lines rhyme with each other, while the fourth line has a rhyme that is constant throughout the whole of the epic. This last rhyme thus serves to tie all stanzas of the epic together. Within a line of eight syllables there are no further meter requirements. The verse form can be illustrated by the first stanza of the Utend̠i wa Tambuka:

Bisimillahi kut̠ubu
yina la Mola Wahhabu
Arraḥamani eribu
na Arraḥimu ukyowa

The first three lines all end in -bu. The last syllable of the fourth line ends in the vowel a, and this sound is found at the end of every stanza of the poem. When recited, this last syllable is sustained for some time and given emphasis.

See also
Swahili literature

References
Chum, Haji & H.E. Lambert (1962). Utenzi wa vita vya Uhud (The epic of the battle of Uhud), collected and compiled by Haji Chum, edited with a translation and notes by H. E. Lambert. (Johari za Kiswahili, vol. 3). Nairobi.
 Gérard, S. (1976) "Structure and values in three Swahili epics", Research in African Literatures, 7, 1, 7-22.
Knappert, Jan (1967). Traditional Swahili poetry: an investigation into the concepts of East African Islam as reflected in the Utenzi literature. Leiden: Brill.
Knappert, Jan (1977). Het Epos van Heraklios. Uit het Swahili vertaald in het oorspronkelijke metrum. Amsterdam: Meulenhoff. (Dutch translation in the original meter).
Knappert, Jan. (1999). A Survey of Swahili Islamic Epic Sagas. Lewiston [etc.]: Edwin Mellen Press.
Wamitila, K. W. (1999). "A Rhetorical Study of Kiswahili Classical Poetry: An Investigation into the Nature and Role of Repetition", Research in African Literatures, 30, 1, Spring 1999, 58-73.

Notes

 
Swahili poetry